Binnya Waru (c. 1418–1451) was the 12th king of the Hanthawaddy Kingdom in Burma from 1446 to 1451. He was a nephew and adopted son of King Binnya Ran I after whom he succeeded to the Hanthawaddy throne. The king was known for his strict disciplinary rule. He reportedly liked to travel around the kingdom disguised as a commoner to observe the affairs firsthand, and meted out justice even to those who committed petty crimes. Binnya Waru was killed by his first cousin Binnya Kyan, son of King Binnya Dhammaraza, in 1451.

Brief
Binnya Waru was born to Shin Sawbu, a daughter of King Razadarit and Binnya Bye, Razadarit's nephew. He had two sisters Netaka Taw and Netaka Thin. His father died in 1419. In 1423, his mother Shin Sawbu was sent to Ava as a present to King Thihathu of Ava by his uncle Crown Prince Binnya Ran. A year later, after Binnya Ran became king after poisoning King Binnya Dhammaraza, another one of his uncles, Binnya Ran adopted the parent-less Waru as his own. In 1430, his mother Shin Sawbu fled Ava and returned to Pegu. But none of her children, Waru included, recognized her since she had been away for seven years.

He ascended the throne in 1446 after his uncle Binnya Ran I's death. He reigned for about five years.

Historiography
Various Burmese chronicles do not agree on the key dates of the king's life.

Notes

References

Bibliography
 
 
 
 
 
 

Hanthawaddy dynasty
1451 deaths
Year of birth uncertain
15th-century Burmese monarchs